Mochh , is a town and union council, an administrative subdivision, of Mianwali District in the Punjab province of Pakistan. It is part of Mianwali Tehsil and is located north of the district capital at 32°44'49N 71°30'51E and lies east of the Indus River.

References

Union councils of Mianwali District